Jessé José Freire de Souza or simply Jessé Souza (29 March 1960) is a Brazilian professor and researcher.

On 2 April 2015, Souza was assigned by the Brazilian government as president of the Instituto de Pesquisa Econômica Aplicada (Ipea), replacing Sergei Suarez Dillon Soares. His contract was terminated in May 2016, when Michel Temer took office as acting president, following Dilma Rousseff's impeachment.

Works 
 Souza, Jessé. A Elite do Atraso: Da Escravidão à Lava Jato.[The Elite of the Delay: From Slavery to Operation Car Wash]  Rio de Janeiro: Leya. 2017. ISBN 978-85-441-0538-2.
 Souza, Jessé. A tolice da inteligência brasileira: ou como o país se deixa manipular pela elite. São Paulo, LeYa, 2015.
 Souza, Jessé/ REHBEIN, Boike. Ungleichheit in kapitalistischen Gesellschaften. Weinheim y Basel: Beltz Juventa, 2014.
 Souza, Jessé. Os batalhadores brasileiros: Nova classe média ou nova classe trabalhadora? Belo Horizonte: UFMG, 2010. (Coleção Humanitas) (2ª edição em 2012)
 Souza, Jessé. A ralé brasileira: quem é e como vive. Belo Horizonte: UFMG, 2009.
 Souza, Jessé. Die Soziale Konstruktion der peripheren Ungleicheit. Wiesbaden: VS Verlag für Sozialwissenschaften, 2008.
 Souza, Jessé (Org.). A Invisibilidade da Desigualdade Brasileira. Belo Horizonte: UFMG, 2006.
 Souza, Jessé (Org.). Imagining Brazil. Lanham: Lexington Books, 2006.
 Kühn, Thomas / Souza, Jessé (Org.) Das moderne Brasilien. Gesellschaft, Politik und Kultur in der Peripherie des Westens. Wiesbaden: VS Verlag für Sozialwissenschaften, 2006.
 Souza, Jessé. A Construção Social da Subcidadania. Belo Horizonte: UFMG, 2006.
 Souza, Jessé. A Modernização Seletiva: Uma Reinterpretação do Dilema Brasileiro. Brasília: UNB, 2000.

References 

1960 births
Brazilian sociologists
Living people